A Housing minister is the member of a country's government typically responsible for Housing Policy.

Country-related articles and lists 

  Australia: Minister for Housing
  Victoria: Minister for Housing
  Western Australia: Minister for Housing
  Canada:
  Ontario: Minister of Municipal Affairs and Housing
  Ireland: Minister for Housing, Local Government and Heritage
  Colombia: Minister of Housing, City and Territory of Colombia
: Minister of State for Housing and Urban Affairs
: Minister of Housing and Local Government
 : Minister of Housing, Spatial Planning and the Environment
 : Minister of Housing and Urban Development
 : Minister of Housing
 : Minister of Housing and Construction
 : Minister for Housing
  United Kingdom:
  England: Secretary of State for Housing, Communities and Local Government; Minister of State for Housing
  Scotland: Minister for Housing and Communities
  Wales: Minister for Housing and Local Government
 : Minister of Housing, Territorial Planning and Environment
  Tanzania: Minister of Lands, Housing and Human Settlements Developments
  United States: United States Secretary of Housing and Urban Development

References

See also 
 Ministry of housing

Government ministers by portfolio